A balneario (Portuguese spelling: balneário) is an Iberian and Latin American resort town, typically a seaside resort, and less commonly along the shores of lakes and rivers or next to hot springs. In Spain, balneario typically only refers to spa town resorts. These resorts offer recreation, sports, entertainment, food, hospitality and safety services, retail, and cultural events. These balneario towns are characterized by being flooded by masses of tourists during the summer seasons.

History
The word "balneario" comes from Latin "balnearĭus" and initially from Greek "balneae" from Greek βαλανεῖον balaneion, - "bath, bathing room".

Balnearios may be as simple as a beach or as complex as a planned city. Mexico's Acapulco and Puerto Vallarta are balneario city-destinations, for example, while Chile's San Alfonso del Mar is a more planned resort community and its Viña del Mar a city that also happens to be a balneario. Balnearios are characterized by having beaches and hot climates, being seasonal destinations, attracting foreign tourists, and having boom periods surrounding festivals. The word comes from Spanish, and the difference between a "playa'' (beach) and a balneario is the services provided at the balneario.

Playa versus balneario
A beach is simply a stretch of shoreline, usually sandy, while a balneario has amenities. It is a specific recreational destination with features such as bathrooms, lifeguards, changing rooms, and picnic tables.

Famous balnearios

 Angra dos Reis, Brazil
 Armação dos Búzios, Brazil
 Balneário Camboriú, Brazil
 Copacabana/Rio de Janeiro, Brazil
 Florianópolis, Brazil
 Fortaleza, Brazil
 Guarujá, Brazil
 Ilhabela, Brazil
 Ilhéus, Brazil
 Itacaré, Brazil
 Jijoca de Jericoacoara, Brazil
 Luís Correia, Brazil
 Mar del Plata, Argentina
 Maragogi, Brazil
 Costa do Sauípe, Brazil
 Natal, Brazil
 Porto de Galinhas, Brazil
 Porto Seguro, Brazil
 Salinópolis, Brazil
 São Sebastião, Brazil
 Trancoso, Brazil
 Pinamar, Argentina
 Central Litoral, Chile
 Algarrobo
 Viña del Mar
 Reñaca
 Zapallar
 La Serena, Chile
 Punta Cana, Dominican Republic
 Montañita, Ecuador
 Acapulco, Mexico
 Cancún, Mexico
 La Paz/Cabo San Lucas, Mexico
 Playa del Cármen/Cozumel, Mexico
 Progreso, Mexico
 Puerto Vallarta, Mexico
 San Bernardino, Paraguay
 Máncora, Peru
 Aguadilla, Puerto Rico, U.S.
 Culebra, Puerto Rico, U.S.
 Mayaguez, Puerto Rico, U.S.
 San Juan, Puerto Rico, U.S.
 Vieques, Puerto Rico, U.S.
 Cuaró, Uruguay
 Punta del Este, Uruguay
 Isla Margarita, Venezuela

See also
Balneario da Toxa, Galicia, Spain

References

External links
Chilean balnearios

Latin America
Seaside resorts